The Baihe Reservoir is a reservoir in Baihe District, Tainan, Taiwan.

History
The reservoir was constructed in 1965. During the drought in early 2021, the reservoir became completely dry in March-April. In June 2021, a discharge warning was issued for the dam.

Technical specifications
The reservoir has an effective capacity of 9,690,000 m3.

See also
 List of dams and reservoirs in Taiwan

References

1965 establishments in Taiwan
Buildings and structures in Tainan
Energy infrastructure completed in 1965
Reservoirs in Taiwan